Sir Charles Henry Collett, 1st Baronet (July 1864 – 23 November 1938) was Lord Mayor of London for 1933 to 1934.

See also
Collett baronets

References

Links
Biography, ukwhoswho.com. Accessed 6 January 2023.

20th-century lord mayors of London
Knights Bachelor
1864 births
1938 deaths